Moving Target is a 1988 Italian film directed and written by Marius Mattei.

Plot
Kim received from her boyfriend the key to a safety deposit box that holds the swag. Chasing the girl a motorcyclist who does not hesitate to kill anyone who obstacles, a journalist and a photographer. On their trail the police captain Morrison.

Cast
 Ernest Borgnine as Captain Morrison
 Linda Blair as Sally Tyler
 Stuart Whitman as Joe Frank
 Gabriella Giorgelli as Billie Cody
 Charles Pitt as Ferry Spencer
 Janine Lindemulder as Allison Spencer
 Emy Valentino as Julia Martinez

References

External links 
 

1988 films
Italian thriller films
English-language Italian films
1988 thriller films
1980s English-language films
1980s Italian films